The Isaac Murphy Handicap is an American Thoroughbred horse race held annually in late June at Arlington Park racetrack in a suburb of Chicago, Illinois. The race is run on Polytrack synthetic dirt and is open to fillies and mares, age three and older who were bred in the State of Illinois.

The race is named in honor of Isaac Burns Murphy, a U.S. Racing Hall of Fame jockey whom the Hall says "is considered one of the greatest race riders in American history." Isaac Murphy raced in Chicago and won the city's then very prestigious American Derby on four occasions.

The race was run as the Isaac Murphy Memorial Handicap from its inception in 1976 through 1980. Inaugurated at a distance of  miles on turf, since then it has been contested at various distances on both turf and dirt:

On turf: 1976, 1991–1996
  miles : 1976
  miles: 1991-1996

On dirt: 1977, 1980–1990, 1997 to present
 6 furlongs : 1986, 1997 to present
 7 furlongs : 1987-1990
 1 mile : 1977, 1980–85
  miles : 1978-79

The race was restricted to three-year-old horses from 1980 through 1985 and again between 1991 and 1994. For 1983 only, it was limited to colts and geldings only. There were no state-bred restrictions prior to 1980 nor during the period from 1986 through 1996. 

There was no running of the Isaac Murphy Handicap in 1988, 1995, 1998 and 1999.

Records
Speed  record: (at current distance of 6 furlongs)
 1:08.00 - Taylor's Special (1986)

Most wins:
 2 - Taylor's Special (1986, 1987)

Most wins by a jockey:
 2 - Earlie Fires (1981, 1992)
 2 - Pat Day (1986, 1987)
 2 - Carlos Silva (1991, 2004)
 2 - James Graham (2005, 2007)

Most wins by a trainer:
 2 - William I. Mott (1986, 1987)

Most wins by an owner:
 2 - William F. Lucas (1986, 1987)

Winners of the Isaac Murphy Handicap

Horse races in Illinois
Recurring sporting events established in 1976
Arlington Park
1976 establishments in Illinois